ŠFK Prenaks Jablonec is a Slovak football team, based in the village of Jablonec. The club was founded in 1937.

External links 
at mkregion.sk

References

Football clubs in Slovakia
Association football clubs established in 1937
1937 establishments in Slovakia